Sporobolus virginicus, known by numerous common names including seashore dropseed, marine couch, sand couch, salt couch grass, saltwater couch, coastal rat-tail grass, and nioaka, is a species of grass with a wide distribution.

Description
Its flowers are green or purple. It reproduces asexually by use of both stolons and rhizomes.

Taxonomy
It was originally published by Carl Linnaeus in 1753, under the name Agrostis virginicus. It was transferred into Sporobolus by Karl Sigismund Kunth in 1829. It has a great many synonyms.

Distribution and habitat
It grows in Australia, New Zealand, many Pacific Islands, the Caribbean, Africa, India, China and Indonesia. It is widespread in Australia, occurring in every state, although in New South Wales it is considered naturalised.

References

External links
Online Field guide to Common Saltmarsh Plants of Queensland

virginicus
Bunchgrasses of Africa
Bunchgrasses of Asia
Bunchgrasses of Australasia
Bunchgrasses of North America
Flora of the Caribbean
Flora of tropical Asia
Grasses of China
Grasses of India
Grasses of New Zealand
Flora of Norfolk Island
Poales of Australia
Flora of South Australia
Flora of Tasmania
Flora of Queensland
Flora of the Northern Territory
Angiosperms of Western Australia
Taxa named by Carl Linnaeus
Plants described in 1753